Waverley Lewis Root (April 15, 1903, in Providence, Rhode Island – October 31, 1982 in Paris) was an American journalist and writer. Root authored the classic The Food of Italy on Italy and its regional cuisines.

Early life and education
Root was born in Providence, Rhode Island, and raised in Fall River, Massachusetts. He obtained his degree from Tufts College in Medford, Mass.

Career
Root was a news correspondent for over 30 years;  in 1969 he retired from daily journalism. He was the Paris correspondent for the Chicago Tribune and then The Washington Post. He was also a columnist for the International Herald Tribune.

His books and writings focused on food, and yet mingled culinary details of the regions he wrote about with historic facts, and literary references.

After graduating from college, he moved to Greenwich Village, New York City.

Writings
Waverley Root became widely known for his writings on food, including:
The Food of France (1958)
The Cooking of Italy (1968)
Paris Dining Guide (1969)
The Food of Italy (1971)
Eating in America: A History (1976) – with Richard De Rochemont
Food, an Authoritative and Visual History and Dictionary of the Foods of the World (1980)

Among his other books are the following:
The Truth about Wagner (1928)
The Secret History of the War (1946)
Winter Sports in Europe (1956)
The Paris Edition: The Autobiography of Waverley Root, 1927-1934 (1987)''

Family
At the time of his death, Root was married to Colette Root. He had a daughter,  from his third marriage.

Death
Root died in his sleep at the age of 79. The cause of his death was a pulmonary ailment.

References 

American male journalists
20th-century American journalists
American food writers
1903 births
1982 deaths
20th-century American non-fiction writers
20th-century American male writers
James Beard Foundation Award winners